The Gas Attacks at Hulluch were two German cloud gas attacks on British troops during World War I, from 27 to 29 April 1916, near the village of Hulluch,  north of Loos in northern France. The gas attacks were part of an engagement between divisions of the II Royal Bavarian Corps and divisions of the British I Corps.

Just before dawn on 27 April, the 16th (Irish) Division and part of the 15th (Scottish) Division were subjected to a cloud gas attack near Hulluch. The gas cloud and artillery bombardment were followed by raiding parties, which made temporary lodgements in the British lines. Two days later the Germans began another gas attack but the wind turned and blew the gas back over the German lines. A large number of German casualties were caused by the change in the wind direction and the decision to go ahead despite protests by local officers. German casualties were increased by the British, who fired on German soldiers as they fled in the open.

The gas used by the German troops at Hulluch was a mixture of chlorine and phosgene, which had first been used on 19 December 1915 at Wieltje, near Ypres. The German gas was of sufficient concentration to penetrate the British PH gas helmets and the 16th (Irish) Division was unjustly blamed for poor gas discipline. It was put out that the gas helmets of the division were of inferior manufacture, to allay doubts as to the effectiveness of the helmet. Production of the Small Box Respirator, which had worked well during the attack, was accelerated.

Background

1915

By the end of the Battle of Loos in 1915, the British armies in France held ground which was usually inferior to the German positions opposite, which were on higher ground, which was drier and had good observation over the British lines and rear areas. In early 1916 the British took over more of the Western Front, to allow the French Tenth Army to move south to Verdun, ground which was just as tactically disadvantageous. Only around Armentières were the German defences on lower ground. The possibility of a withdrawal to more easily defensible ground was rejected by Joffre, the French Generalissimo and all the Allied commanders preferred to improve their positions by advancing. With this in mind, the French and British made far less effort to improve their defences, which conceded another advantage to the Germans, who could attack positions protected by far less extensive barbed wire barriers and few deep-mined dugouts than their own. Allowing such positions to relapse into quiet fronts was rejected by the British, who instituted sniping, unpredictable artillery bombardments and raids, which provoked German retaliation; the British conducted three attacks against five by the Germans and numerous raids.

1916
In early 1916, the Germans had more and better equipment for trench warfare, with good quality hand grenades, rifle grenades and trench mortars; the Germans made more effort to repair and improve defences and with a homogeneous army, found it easier to move artillery, ammunition and men along the front. A substantial cadre of the pre-war trained officers and conscripts remained, to lead the wartime recruits. British tunnellers achieved an ascendancy over their German equivalents but in ground operations, the number of operational machine-guns and the volume and accuracy of artillery-fire had more effect than individual skill and bravery; the quantity of heavy guns often determined the course of engagements. The success of a local attack left the victors vulnerable to a counter-attack and captured positions were often more costly to hold than the previous positions.

Prelude

German preparations and plan
German artillery began a systematic bombardment of British observation posts, supply points and communication trenches, supplemented by trench mortar and rifle grenade fire. Shelling diminished from 24 to 25 April and on 26 April, the positions of the 16th (Irish) Division were bombarded and the 12th (Eastern) Division front was raided. The next day was fine and warm, with a wind blowing towards the British lines. The 4th Bavarian Division was to follow up a gas attack on 27 April with patrols against the British positions. Two days later, despite less favourable winds, a second gas discharge was ordered against the wishes of the local commanders, who were over-ruled.

British preparations
Rats had been seen moving away from the German trenches and was inferred to be due to leaky gas cylinders. The 15th (Scottish) Division relief of the 12th (Eastern) Division from 24 to 30 April was allowed to proceed. Four reserve artillery batteries were moved into the 15th (Scottish) Division area and all units were required to rehearse gas alerts daily. The British were equipped with PH helmets, which protected against phosgene up to a concentration of

Attack

27 April
The discharge on the front of Bavarian Infantry Regiment 9 (BIR 9) was cancelled, as the direction of the wind risked enveloping the 3rd Bavarian Division on the right flank, in the  Redoubt sector. At  German artillery began a high-explosive, shrapnel and trench-mortar bombardment, on the front of the 16th (Irish) Division and the right flank of the 15th (Scottish) Division to the north, laid a barrage on communication trenches and fired lachrymatory shells into villages and British rear positions. At  gas and smoke clouds rose from the German trenches and moved towards the British trenches, blown by a south-easterly wind.

Three German mines were exploded at  another artillery bombardment was fired and a second gas cloud was discharged. Several raiding parties of about  each, followed the gas and three managed to get into the British trenches. One party entered the British front line at Chalk Pit Wood for about fifteen minutes; the second was quickly expelled from the lines north of Posen Alley and caught by Lewis-gun fire in no man's land. The third party got into the trenches on the right flank of the 15th (Scottish) Division, just north of the Vermelles–Hulluch road and was promptly bombed out; by  the raiding parties had withdrawn.

At  on 27 April, a gas alert was raised in the 16th (Irish) Division area and the divisional and corps artillery began a bombardment on the rear of the German lines, from whence the gas was being discharged. After thirty minutes, groups of German infantry about  equipped with pistols and hand grenades, were seen heading for gaps in the British wire and were repulsed by rifle and machine-gun fire. At about  the three mines were sprung and another bombardment was fired, before sending another gas cloud, which caused many casualties to a Black Watch company, whose commander had ordered them to remove their gas helmets after the first gas cloud, under the impression that the helmets were useless after one exposure to gas. Behind the second gas cloud, larger parties of German infantry advanced and managed to get into the British trenches for brief periods at three points. At Chalk Pit Wood the British had a howitzer, which had been brought up in September 1915, to fire in support of an attack on Hulluch. Since the Lone How was only  behind the British front line, orders had been given to destroy it, in the event of a German raid and a demolition charge had been left on the gun with a lit fuze.

29 April
On 29 April, the German infantry sent up a green then a red flare and at  German artillery began to bombard the reserve and communication trenches of the 16th (Irish) Division. A gas cloud was released, followed by white smoke from Chalk Pit Wood to Hulluch, after BIR 9 had been ordered to discharge the gas by higher authority, despite unfavourable winds. German raiding parties advanced, as the gas moved very slowly and then veered about, as it reached the British third line; the German raiders were then engaged by British infantry with small-arms fire. The gas suddenly blew back towards the German lines and in the area of BIR 9 and BIR 5 the troops of Pioneer Regiment 36 (PR 36) were not able to stop the discharge straight away. Many German troops were caught without gas masks on and had about  casualties. On the right flank, the 3rd Bavarian Division recorded  casualties. The German bombardment abruptly ended, as the gas dispersed southwards.

The 48th Brigade recaptured the wood and a few hours later the Lone How was discovered intact, the fuze having gone out. The howitzer was so well camouflaged, that the German raiders had not noticed it. British artillery-fire was believed to have destroyed some German gas cylinders, when German troops were seen to climb out of their front trenches and run to the rear, amid British small-arms fire. Eighty dead German soldiers were counted later, in and around the British front trenches. By  the German raid was over and during the night, two British battalions were relieved; the rest of 28 April was quiet, except for a raid by the 1st Division, at the Double Crassier near Loos. At  a German artillery bombardment and gas discharge began on the 16th (Irish) Division front but the expected attack did not occur.

Aftermath

Analysis

The 16th (Irish) Division had a considerable number of gas casualties during the German attacks; the greatest number of deaths occurred, at the points on the British front where the gas was most concentrated. Anti-gas blankets fitted on dugout entrances were found to be ineffective but Lewis-guns wrapped in blankets and sprayed with Vermorel during the passage of the gas cloud, were only slightly affected. Some ammunition was made unusable and some rifles jammed, due to chemical deposits forming on the bolts. The troops most affected by the gas could not be relieved immediately but were exempted from carrying duties for the next day and no ill effects were reported. British troops were said to have been greatly encouraged by the German fiasco but uneasy about the protection offered by their PH gas helmets. The troops were deceived, by being told that the helmets issued to the 16th (Irish) Division, had not been properly impregnated with chemical neutralisers and that 16th (Irish) Division gas discipline had been unsatisfactory. New "box respirators", worn by Lewis gunners, were found to have worked well and production was expedited.

Casualties
On 27 April the 16th (Irish) Division had lost  and the 15th (Scottish) Division reported  Total British casualties from 27 to 29 April were  whom  gas casualties,  killed. German casualties in BIR 5, BRIR 5, PR 36 who operated the gas cylinders and other non-infantry troops were not known in 1932, when the British Official History was published. BIR 9 had   gas, of whom  and there were  gas casualties in the 3rd Bavarian Division, of whom four men died. A contemporary French intelligence summary recorded  in the 4th Bavarian Division from 27 to 29 April and in October 1918, an officer of the British 15th (Scottish) Division found the graves of  gas casualties at the cemetery at Pont-à-Vendin, from the gas discharges. In 1934, Foulkes wrote that a diary taken from a captured soldier of the 4th Bavarian Division, recorded  casualties in the division and in 2002, Hook and Jones recorded  from the German gas which blew back on 29 April.

See also

 Phosgene attack 19 December 1915
 Gas attacks at Wulverghem

Notes

Footnotes

References

External links

 Gas mask development
 A Brief History of the 16th (Irish) Division
 Royal Dublin Fusiliers Association, Irish battalions
 First German use of gas
 12. The Vermoral Sprayer (defensive apparatus)
 The Ayrton Fan (defensive apparatus)
 Gas Warfare
 Gas-Poisoning, by Arthur Hurst, M.A., MD (Oxon), FRCP 1917 effects of chlorine gas poisoning

Hulluch
Military equipment of World War I
War crimes in France
Hulluch
1916 in France
Hulluch 1916
Hulluch 1916
Hulluch 1916
April 1916 events
Friendly fire incidents of World War I